Vannasone Douangmaity (born March 15, 1997) is a Laotian footballer currently playing as a striker for Young Elephant and the Laos national football team

Career statistics

International

International goals
Scores and results list Laos' goal tally first.

References

1997 births
Laotian footballers
Living people
Competitors at the 2019 Southeast Asian Games
Laos international footballers
Association football forwards
People from Attapeu province
Southeast Asian Games competitors for Laos